is a traditional (koryū) school of Japanese martial arts founded from the original teachings of Hontai Yoshin Takagi Ryu, c. 1660, by Takagi Shigetoshi.  Some sources give Takagi's middle name as Setsuemon, while others give it as Oriemon.

This school was active during the Edo period, especially dominant in the Himeji-han and Ako-han. The present headmaster (sōke) is Inoue Kyoichi Munenori who succeeded his father Inoue Tsuyoshi Munetoshi. The handover occurred on 16 January 2005.

Arts practiced

The system teaches unarmed grappling arts and various weapon arts including  bōjutsu, hanbōjutsu, iaijutsu, and kenjutsu.

Modern practice
Although there are a limited number of official Hontai Yōshin-ryū schools across the world, many westerners have benefited from study at the headquarters in Japan. Therefore, the school's influence on the development of modern jujutsu is significant. The Hontai Yōshin-ryū stays true to its values and traditions and does not advocate commercialization.

Lineage
The order of Hontai Yōshin-ryū succession is as follows

Takagi Shigetoshi (born c. 1635, date of death unknown)
Takagi Umanosuke Shigesada
Takagi Gennoshin Hideshige
Okuni Kihei Shigenobu
Okuni Hachikuro Nobutoshi
Okuni Tarodaibu Tadanobu
Okuni Kihyoe Yoshisada
Okuni Yozaemon Yoshisada
Nakayama Jinnai Sadahide
Okuni Buuemon Hidenobu
Nakayama Kizaemon Sadataka
Okuni Kenji Hideshige
Yagi Ikugoro Hisayoshi
Ishiya  Takeo Masatsugu
Ishiya Matsutaro Masaharu
Kakuno Happeita Masayoshi (died c. 1939)
Minaki Saburo Masanori (born c. 1906, date of death unknown)
Inoue Tsuyoshi Munetoshi (born c. 1925)
Inoue Kyoichi Munenori (born c. 1949)

References

External links
 Official Hontai Yoshin Ryu website
 Hontai Yoshin Ryu UK
 Hontai Yoshin Ryu USA
 Hontai Yoshin Ryu Belgium
 Hontai Yoshin Ryu Italy

Ko-ryū bujutsu
Japanese martial arts